Donnenheim is a commune in the Bas-Rhin department in Grand Est in north-eastern France. As with other parts of Alsace and Bas-Rhin, Donnenheim has had periods under German rule, and its name is Germanic. Donnenheim has been part of France since 1790, with an interlude of German rule 1871-1919.

The village has a church, a town hall with library, and a multi-purpose community hall.

See also
 Communes of the Bas-Rhin department

References

Communes of Bas-Rhin